Furcatergalia is a suborder of mayflies in the order Ephemeroptera. There are about 14 families and at least 1,700 described species in Furcatergalia.

Families
These 14 families belong to the suborder Furcatergalia:

 Baetiscidae
 Behningiidae (sand-burrowing mayflies)
 Caenidae (small squaregilled mayflies)
 Ephemerellidae (spiny crawler mayflies)
 Ephemeridae (common burrower mayflies)
 Euthyplociidae
 Leptohyphidae (little stout crawler mayflies)
 Leptophlebiidae (pronggilled mayflies)
 Neoephemeridae (large squaregill mayflies)
 Palingeniidae (riverbed burrower mayflies)
 Polymitarcyidae (pale burrower mayflies)
 Potamanthidae (hacklegilled burrower mayflies)
 Prosopistomatidae
 Tricorythidae

References

Further reading

External links

Mayflies
Articles created by Qbugbot
Insect suborders